Oiseaux (French for 'birds') may refer to:

Literature
, a 1960 book by Jacques Berlioz
, an 1892 book by Émile Deyrolle
, a 1963 poetry collection by Saint-John Perse

Music
, a 1983 album by Greta De Reyghere
, a 1992 album by Têtes Raides
"", a 2016 song by Mr. Oizo from All Wet
"", a 2019 song by Pomme from Les failles

Visual arts
, a 1937 sculpture by Lucien Brasseur
, a 1991 painting by Nadir Afonso

See also
Oiseau (disambiguation)